Chilongius is a genus of Chilean long-spinneret ground spiders that was first described by Norman I. Platnick, M. U. Shadab & L. N. Sorkin in 2005.

Species
 it contains five species, found only in Chile:
Chilongius eltofo Platnick, Shadab & Sorkin, 2005 – Chile
Chilongius frayjorge Platnick, Shadab & Sorkin, 2005 – Chile
Chilongius huasco Platnick, Shadab & Sorkin, 2005 – Chile
Chilongius molles Platnick, Shadab & Sorkin, 2005 – Chile
Chilongius palmas Platnick, Shadab & Sorkin, 2005 (type) – Chile

See also
 List of Gnaphosidae species

References

Araneomorphae genera
Gnaphosidae
Spiders of South America
Endemic fauna of Chile